Blackheath may refer to:

Places

England
Blackheath, London, England
Blackheath railway station
Hundred of Blackheath, Kent, an ancient hundred in the north west of the county of Kent, England
Blackheath, Surrey, England
Hundred of Blackheath, Surrey
Blackheath SSSI, Surrey, a biological Site of Special Scientific Interest
Blackheath, West Midlands, England

Other places
Blackheath, New South Wales, Australia
Black Heath, Virginia, USA, a late 18th and 19th century plantation and coal mine
Blackheath, Gauteng, in Johannesburg, South Africa

Education
 Blackheath College (disambiguation)
 Blackheath High School, Blackheath Village in London, England
 Blackheath Proprietary School, a former school in Greenwich, London, England

Other uses 
 Blackheath Rugby Club
 Blackheath Common, Waverley, England
 Blackheath Beds, a fossiliferous stratigraphic unit in England
 Plantman, a comic book character also called Blackheath